Harold "Gator" Hoskins (born December 19, 1991) is a former American football tight end who last played for the Miami Dolphins of the National Football League (NFL). He played college football at Marshall.

High School & College
Hoskins attended Eastside High School in Gainesville, Florida.

He attended college at Marshall and had a successful career for the Thundering Herd. During his career at Marshall he amassed 99 receptions for 1,318 yards and 28 touchdowns. In Marshall’s Military Bowl victory over Maryland, he had six catches for 104 yards and two touchdowns. He as selected to the 2013 All-Conference USA first-team by league coaches, and was one of eight semifinalists for the annual John Mackey Award that goes to the top tight end in the nation.

Professional career

Miami Dolphins
Hoskins signed with the Miami Dolphins after going undrafted in the 2014 NFL Draft. On December 16, 2014, he was waived by Miami.

Seattle Seahawks
Hoskins was signed to the Seattle Seahawks' practice squad on December 19, 2014. He was released on December 24, 2014.

Eastside High School (coach)
Hoskins was hired as Eastside High School’s head football coach on May 9, 2022.

References

External links
Miami Dolphins bio
Marshall Thundering Herd bio

1991 births
Living people
American football tight ends
Marshall Thundering Herd football players
Miami Dolphins players
Players of American football from San Francisco
Seattle Seahawks players
Eastside High School (Gainesville, Florida) alumni